The Star Press is a morning edition newspaper for Muncie, Indiana, and surrounding areas.

History 
The Muncie Star was first published in 1899 by owner George McCulloch. In 1901, McCulloch purchased the Muncie Morning News, thus publishing two daily papers; the Muncie Morning Star and the Muncie Evening Press.

The newspapers were sold to John C. Shaffer in 1904, then eventually sold to Eugene Pullam's company, Central Newspaper Inc. In 1996, the two newspapers were consolidated to a single publication, the Muncie Star Press. Gannett purchased the newspapers in 2000 and is the current owner.

External links

The Star Press Official Website
Mobile phone version

Newspapers published in Indiana
Publications with year of establishment missing
Gannett publications